The First ministry of Yogi Adityanath is the council of ministers in 17th Uttar Pradesh Legislative Assembly headed by Chief Minister Yogi Adityanath since 19 March 2017. As per the Constitution of India, the Uttar Pradesh Council of Ministers, including the Chief Minister, can have maximum 60 members.

There were 57 Ministers Including the Chief Minister, 22 were cabinet ministers, 8 were state ministers with Independent charge and 27 were State ministers. Out of the 57 ministers, 56 were from the BJP while AD(S) was having 1 minister.

Tenure 
Since 2017 chief minister Adityanath had ordered the closing of many slaughterhouses. As a direct consequence, the tanneries that sourced raw leather from the slaughter houses were impacted. Several tanneries were also ordered to be shut down. The tannery industry was estimated to worth 50,0000 crore ₹ in 2017. The industry directly or indirectly gave employment to more than 10 lakh people. Since 2018, through executive orders, CM Adityanath had closed around 200 tanneries out of a total of more than 400 that were active in Jajamau, Kanpur.

Council of Ministers

Former Ministers

See also
 Uttar Pradesh Legislative Assembly
 Uttar Pradesh Legislative Council

References

Uttar Pradesh ministries
2017 in Indian politics
Bharatiya Janata Party state ministries
Yogi Adityanath
 
Apna Dal (Sonelal)
Suheldev Bharatiya Samaj Party
Bharatiya Janata Party of Uttar Pradesh
2017 establishments in Uttar Pradesh
Cabinets established in 2017